The Beijing Subway is the rapid transit system of Beijing Municipality that consists of 27 lines including 22 rapid transit lines, two airport rail links, one maglev line and 2 light rail lines, and 478 stations. With 3.8484 billion trips delivered in 2018, an average of 10.544 million trips per day, the Beijing Subway is the world's busiest metro system. Single-day ridership set a record of 13.7538 million on July 12, 2019.

The Beijing Subway opened in 1971 and is the oldest metro system in mainland China and on the mainland of East Asia. Before the system began its rapid expansion in 2002, the subway had only two lines. The existing network still cannot adequately meet the city's mass transit needs. The most recent expansion came into effect on February 4, 2023, with the opening of an extension to Changping Line.

Fares

Fare schedules
Single-ride fare
The Beijing Subway charges single-ride fare according to trip distance for all lines except the two airport express lines.

 For all lines except the two airport express lines, fares start at ¥3 for a trip up to 6 km in distance, with ¥1 added for the next 6 km, for every 10 km thereafter until the trip distance reaches 32 km, and for every 20 km beyond the first 32 km. A 40 km trip would cost ¥7.
 The Capital Airport Express has a fixed fare of ¥25 per ride. 
 The Daxing Airport Express is the only line to maintain class-based fares with ordinary class fare varying with distance from ¥10 to ¥35 and business class fare fixed at ¥50 per ride.

Same-station transfers are free on all subway lines except the two Airport Express lines, the Xijiao Line and the Yizhuang T1 Line, which require the purchase of a new fare when transferring to or from those lines.

Fare free riders

Children below  in height ride for free when accompanied by a paying adult. Senior citizens over the age of 65, individuals with physical disabilities, retired revolutionary cadres, police and army veterans who had been wounded in action, military personnel and People's Armed Police can ride the subway for free.

Unlimited-rides fare
Since January 20, 2019, riders can purchase unlimited rides fare tickets using the Yitongxing (亿通行) APP on smartphones, which generates a QR code with effective periods of one to seven days.

Riders can look up fares by checking fare schedules posted in stations, calling the subway hotline 96165, going to the Beijing Subway website, or using the subway's smartphone app.

Previous fare schedules
On December 28, 2014, the Beijing Subway switched from a fixed-fare schedule to the current distance-based fare schedule for all lines except the Capital Airport Express. Prior to the December 28, 2014 fare increase, passengers paid a flat rate of RMB(¥) 2.00 (including unlimited fare-free transfers) for all lines except the Capital Airport Express, which cost ¥25, The flat fare was the lowest among metro systems in China. Before the flat fare schedule was introduced on October 7, 2007, fares ranged from ¥3 to ¥7, depending on the line and number of transfers.

Fare collection
Each station has two to 15 ticket vending machines. Ticket vending machines on all lines can add credit to Yikatong cards. Single-ride tickets take the form of an RFID-enabled flexible plastic card.

Passengers must insert the ticket or scan the card at the gate both before entering and exiting the station. The subway's fare collection gates accept single-ride tickets and the Yikatong fare card. Passengers can purchase tickets and add credit to Yikatong card at ticket counters or vending machines in every station. The Yikatong, also known as Beijing Municipal Administration & Communication Card (BMAC), is an integrated circuit card that stores credit for the subway, urban and suburban buses and e-money for other purchases. The Yikatong card itself must be purchased at the ticket counter. To enter a station, the Yikatong card must have a minimum balance of ¥3.00. Upon exiting the system, single-ride tickets are inserted into the turnstile, which are reused by the system.

To prevent fraud, passengers are required to complete their journeys within four hours upon entering the subway. If the four-hour limit is exceeded, a surcharge of ¥3 is imposed. Each Yikatong card is allowed to be overdrawn once.  The overdrawn amount is deducted when credits are added to the card.

Yikatong card users who spend more than ¥100 on subway fare in a calendar month will receive credits to their card the following month. After reaching ¥100 of spending in one calendar month, 20% of any further spending up to ¥150 will be credited. When spending exceeds ¥150, 50% of any further spending up to ¥250 will be credited. Once expenditures exceed ¥400, further spending won't earn any more credits. The credits are designed to ease commuters' burdens of fare increases.

Beginning in June 2017, single-journey tickets could be purchased via a phone app. A May 2018 upgrade allowed entrance via scanning a QR code from the same app.

Since the COVID-19 pandemic, a name and Chinese Resident Identity Card number must be entered when buying single-ride tickets for contact tracing purposes. This measure has been criticized for increasing the time spent buying tickets.

Lines in operation
Beijing Subway lines generally follow the checkerboard layout of the city. Most lines through the urban core (outlined by the Line 10 loop) run parallel or perpendicular to each other and intersect at right angles.

Lines through the urban core
The urban core of Beijing is roughly outlined by the Line 10 loop, which runs underneath or just beyond the 3rd Ring Road.  Each of the following lines provides extensive service within the Line 10 loop. All have connections to seven or more lines. Lines 1, 4, 5, 6 and 8 also run through the Line 2 loop, marking the old Ming-Qing era city of Beijing.

Line 1: straight east–west line underneath Chang'an Avenue, bisecting the city through Tiananmen Square. Line 1 connects major commercial centres, Xidan, Wangfujing, Dongdan and the Beijing CBD.
Line 2: the inner rectangular loop line that traces the Ming-era inner city wall which once surrounded the inner city, with stops at 11 of the wall's former gates (ending in men), now busy intersections, as well as the Beijing railway station.
Line 4: mainly north–south line running to the west of city centre with stops at the Summer Palace, Old Summer Palace, Peking and Renmin Universities, Zhongguancun, National Library, Beijing Zoo, Xidan, Taoranting and Beijing South railway station.
Line 5: straight north–south line running to the east of the city centre. Line 5 passes the Temple of Earth, Yonghe Temple and the Temple of Heaven.
Line 6: east–west line running parallel and to the north of Line 1, passing through the city centre north of Beihai Park. At 53.4 km, Line 6 is the second longest Beijing Subway line after Line 10, and runs from Shijingshan District in the west to the Beijing City Sub-Center in Tongzhou District, terminating at Lucheng just beyond the eastern 6th Ring Road.
 Line 8: north–south line following the Beijing's central axis from Changping District through Huilongguan, the Olympic Green, Shichahai and Nanluoguxiang, where the line veers east of the Forbidden City and Tiananmen Square with stops at the National Art Museum and Wangfujing before returning to the central axis at Qianmen and continuing due south through Zhushikou and Yongdingmen to Heyi before turning southwest to Yinghai in Daxing District. 
 Line 9: north–south line running to the west of Line 4 from the National Library through the Military Museum and Beijing West railway station to Guogongzhuang in the southwestern suburbs.
Line 10, the outer loop line running beneath or just beyond the Third Ring Road. Apart from the Line 2 loop, which is entirely enclosed within the Line 10 loop, every other line through the urban core intersects with Line 10. In the north, Line 10 traces Beijing's Yuan-era city wall.  In the east, Line 10 passes through the Beijing CBD.
Line 14: inverted-L shaped line that connects the southwest, southeast and northeast parts of the city.  From  in the southwest, Line 14 runs due west and enters the Line 10 loop at Xiju and passing through the Beijing South Railway Station, Yongdingmenwai, Puhuangyu, Fangzhuang and leaves the Line 10 loop at Shilihe before turning north at Beijing University of Technology and running south - north outside the Line 10 loop through the Beijing CBD, Chaoyang Park and Jiuxianqiao to Wangjing in the northeast.

Lines serving outlying suburbs
Each of the following lines provides service predominantly to one or more of the suburbs beyond the 5th Ring Road. Lines 15, S1 along with the Changping, Daxing, Yanfang lines extend beyond the 6th Ring Road.
Line 13 arcs across suburbs north of the city and transports commuters to Xizhimen and Dongzhimen, at the northwest and northeast corners of Line 2.
Line 15 east–west line which runs between the northern 4th and 5th Ring Road from the east of Tsinghua University, through the Olympic Green and Wangjing, turning northeast to suburban Shunyi District.
Batong line extends Line 1 eastward from Sihui to suburban Tongzhou District.
Daxing line extends Line 4 south to suburban Daxing District.
Yanfang line extends the Fangshan line further into western Fangshan District.
Yizhuang line extends from Line 5's southern terminus to the Yizhuang Economic & Technological Development Zone in the southeastern suburbs.
Line S1, a low-speed maglev line connecting suburban Mentougou District with Line 6 in Shijingshan District.
Yizhuang T1 line, a light rail line runs from Quzhuang in Daxing District to Dinghaiyuan in Tongzhou District.

Future expansion

Phase II 
According to the Phase 2 construction plan approved by the NDRC in 2015, the length of Beijing Subway will reach  when the Phase 2 construction finished. By then, public transit will comprise 60% of all trips. Of those, the subway will comprise 62%. The adjustment of the Phase 2 construction plan was approved by the NDRC on December 5, 2019. Which altered and expanded some projects in the Phase 2 construction plan. Including adjusting alignments of Line 22 and Line 28 and additional projects such as the Daxing Airport Line north extension, the west section of Line 11 and transforming Line 13 into two lines, 13A and 13B.

Phase III (2022–2027) 
According to the information released in July 2022, the "Beijing Rail Transit Phase III Construction Plan" includes 11 construction projects: Line 1 Branch, Line 7 Phase 3, Line 11 Phase 2, Line 15 Phase 2, Line 17 Phase 2 (Branch), Line 19 Phase 2, Line 20 Phase 1, Fangshan line (Line 25) Phase 3 (also known as Lijin Line), Line M101 Phase 1, Line S6 (New Town Link Line) Phase 1, and the connecting line between Yizhuang line, Line 5 and Line 10.

Owner and operators
The Beijing Subway is owned by the Beijing Municipal People's Government through the Beijing Infrastructure Investment Co., LTD, (北京市基础设施投资有限公司 or BIIC), a wholly owned subsidiary of the Beijing State-owned Assets Supervision and Administration Commission (北京市人民政府国有资产监督管理委员会 or Beijing SASAC), the municipal government's asset holding entity.

The Beijing Subway was originally developed and controlled by the Central Government. The subway's construction and planning was headed by a special committee of the State Council. In February 1970, Premier Zhou Enlai handed management of the subway to the People's Liberation Army, which formed the PLA Rail Engineering Corp Beijing Subway Management Bureau. In November 1975, by order of the State Council and Central Military Commission the bureau was placed under the authority of Beijing Municipal Transportation Department.

On April 20, 1981, the bureau became the Beijing Subway Company, which was a subsidiary of the Beijing Public Transportation Company.

In July 2001, the Beijing Municipal Government reorganized the subway company into the Beijing Subway Group Company Ltd., a wholly city-owned holding company, which assumed ownership of all of the subway's assets. In November 2003, the assets of the Beijing Subway Group Company were transferred to the newly created BIIC.

The Beijing Subway has five operators: 
The main operator is the wholly state-owned Beijing Mass Transit Railway Operation Corp. (北京市地铁运营有限公司 or Beijing Subway OpCo), which was formed in the reorganization of the original Beijing Subway Group Company in 2001, and operates 15 lines: Lines 1, 2, 5–10, 13, 15, Batong line, Changping line, Fangshan line, Yizhuang line and S1 line.
The Beijing MTR Corp. (北京京港地铁有限公司 or Beijing MTR), a public–private joint venture formed in 2005 by and among Beijing Capital Group, a state company under Beijing SASAC (with 49% equity ownership), MTR Corporation of Hong Kong (49%), and BIIC (2%), and operates four lines: Lines 4, 14, 16 and Line 17 and Daxing line.
The  (北京市轨道交通运营管理有限公司 or BJMOA), a subsidiary of Beijing Metro Construction Administration Corporation Ltd. (北京市轨道交通建设管理有限公司 or BJMCA) also under Beijing SASAC, became the third company to obtain operation rights for the Beijing Subway in 2015. The BJMOA operates the Yanfang line, Daxing Airport Express, and Line 19. Its corporate parent, BJMCA, is a general contractor for Beijing Subway construction.
The Beijing Public Transit Tramway Co., Ltd. (北京公交有轨电车有限公司), formed in 2017, is a wholly owned subsidiary of Beijing Public Transport Corporation (北京公共交通控股（集团）有限公司 or BPTC) that operates the Xijiao line. Its corporate parent, BPTC, is the city's main public bus operator.
The  (北京京城地铁有限公司), also branded as "Capital Metro" (京城地铁) in their official logo, operates the Capital Airport Express. Beijing City Metro Ltd. is a joint venture established on February 15, 2016, between Beijing Subway OpCo (51%) and BII Railway Transportation Technology Holdings Company Limited (49%)(京投轨道交通科技控股有限公司), a Hong Kong listed company (1522.HK) controlled by BIIC. On March 27, 2017, Beijing City Metro Ltd. acquired a 30-year right to operate the Capital Airport Express and sections of the Dongzhimen subway station.

Rolling stock

All subway train sets run on  standard gauge rail, except the maglev trains on Line S1, which run on a maglev track. Beijing Subway operates Type B trains on most lines. However, due to increasing congestion on the network, high capacity Type A trains are increasingly being used. Additionally, Type D trains are being used in express subway lines.

Until 2003 nearly all trains were manufactured by the Changchun Railway Vehicles Company Ltd., now a subsidiary of the China CNR Corporation. The newest Line 1 trains and those on Lines 4, 8, Batong, Changping and Daxing are made by Qingdao Sifang Locomotive & Rolling Stock Co., a subsidiary of China South Locomotive and Rolling Stock Industry Corp. Line S1's maglev trains were produced by CRRC Tangshan.

The Beijing Subway Rolling Stock Equipment Co. Ltd., a wholly owned subsidiary of the Beijing Mass Transit Railway Operation Corp. Ltd., provides local assemblage, maintenance and repair services.

Automated lines 
There will be 6 fully automated lines at the level of GoA4, including 4 lines in operation (the Yanfang line,  Line 17 and Line 19 and the Daxing Airport Express) and 2 lines under construction (Line 3 and Line 12), using domestically developed communications-based train control systems.

History

1953–1965: origins
The subway was proposed in September 1953 by the city's planning committee and experts from the Soviet Union. After the end of the Korean War, Chinese leaders turned their attention to domestic reconstruction. They were keen to expand Beijing's mass transit capacity but also valued the subway as an asset for civil defense. They studied the use of the Moscow Metro to protect civilians, move troops and headquarter military command posts during the Battle of Moscow, and planned the Beijing Subway for both civilian and military use.

At that time, the Chinese lacked expertise in building subways and drew heavily on Soviet and East German technical assistance. In 1954, a delegation of Soviet engineers, including some who had built the Moscow Metro, was invited to plan the subway in Beijing. From 1953 to 1960, several thousand Chinese students were sent to the Soviet Union to study subway construction. Two routes vied for the first to be built. One ran east–west from Wukesong to Hongmiao, underneath Changan Avenue. The other ran north–south from the Summer Palace to Zhongshan Park, via Xizhimen and Xisi. The former was chosen due to more favorable geological foundation and greater number of government bureaus served. The second route would not be built until construction on Line 4 began forty years later.

The original proposal called for deep subway tunnels that can better serve military functions.

The deterioration of relations between China and Soviet Union disrupted subway planning. Soviet experts began to leave in 1960, and were completely withdrawn by 1963. In 1961, the entire project was halted temporarily due to severe hardships caused by the Great Leap Forward. Eventually, planning work resumed. The route of the initial line was shifted westward to create an underground conduit to move personnel from the heart of the capital to the Western Hills. On February 4, 1965, Chairman Mao Zedong personally approved the project.

1965–1981: the slow beginning

Construction began on July 1, 1965, at a ceremony attended by national leaders including Zhu De, Deng Xiaoping, and mayor Peng Zhen. The most controversial outcome of the initial subway line was the demolition of the Beijing's historic inner city wall to make way for the subway. Construction plans for the subway from Fuxingmen to the Beijing Railway Station called for the removal of the wall, as well as the gates and archery towers at Hepingmen, Qianmen, and Chongwenmen. Leading architect Liang Sicheng argued for protecting the wall as a landmark of the ancient capital. Chairman Mao favored demolishing the wall over demolishing homes. In the end, Premier Zhou Enlai managed to preserve several walls and gates, such as the Qianmen gate and its arrow tower by slightly altering the course of the subway.

The initial line was completed and began trial operations in time to mark the 20th anniversary of the founding of the People's Republic on October 1, 1969. It ran  from Gucheng to the Beijing Railway Station and had 16 stations. This line forms parts of present-day Lines 1 and 2. It was the first subway to be built in China, and predates the metros of Hong Kong, Seoul, Singapore, San Francisco, and Washington, D.C., but technical problems would plague the project for the next decade.

Initially, the subway hosted guest visits. On November 11, 1969, an electrical fire killed three people, injured over 100 and destroyed two cars. Premier Zhou Enlai placed the subway under the control of the People's Liberation Army in early 1970, but reliability problems persisted.

Single ride fare was set at ¥0.10 and only members of the public with credential letters from their work units could purchase tickets. The number of trains per day rose to 100. Overall, the line delivered 8.28 million rides in 1971, averaging 28,000 riders per day.

From 1971 to 1975, the subway was shut down for 398 days for political reasons. On December 27, 1972, the riders no longer needed to present credential letters to purchase tickets. In 1972, the subway delivered 15 million rides and averaged 41,000 riders per day. The line delivered 11 million rides in 1973, averaging 54,000 riders per day.

Despite its return to civilian control in 1976, the subway remained prone to closures due to fires, flooding, and accidents. Annual ridership grew from 22.2 million in 1976 and 28.4 million in 1977 to 30.9 million in 1978, and 55.2 million in 1980.

1981–2000: two lines for two decades
On April 20, 1981, the Beijing Subway Company, then a subsidiary of the Beijing Public Transportation Company, was organized to take over subway operations. On September 15, 1981, the initial line passed its final inspections, and was handed over to the Beijing Subway Company, ending a decade of trial operations. It had 19 stations and ran  from Fushouling in the Western Hills to the Beijing railway station. Investment in the project totaled ¥706 million. Annual ridership rose from 64.7 million in 1981 and 72.5 million in 1982 to 82 million in 1983.

On September 20, 1984, a second line was opened to the public. This horseshoe-shaped line was created from the eastern half of the initial line and corresponds to the southern half of the present-day Line 2. Ridership reached 105 million in 1985.

On December 28, 1987, the two existing lines were reconfigured into Lines 1, which ran from Pingguoyuan to Fuxingmen and Line 2, in its current loop, tracing the Ming city wall. Fares doubled to ¥0.20 for single-line rides and ¥0.30 for rides with transfers. Ridership reached 307 million in 1988. The subway was closed from June 3–4, 1989 during the suppression of the Tiananmen Square demonstrations. In 1990, the subway carried more than one million riders per day for the first time, as total ridership reached 381 million. After a fare hike to ¥0.50 in 1991, annual ridership declined slightly to 371 million.

On January 26, 1991, planning began on the eastward extension of Line 1 under Chang'an Avenue from Fuxingmen. The project was funded by a 19.2 billion yen low-interest development assistance loan from Japan. Construction began on the eastern extension on June 24, 1992, and the Xidan station opened on December 12, 1992. National leaders Wen Jiabao, Jia Qinglin, Yu Zhengsheng and mayor Liu Qi were on hand to mark the occasion. The full-length of Line 1 became operational on June 28, 2000.

Despite little track expansion in the early 1990s, ridership grew rapidly to reach a record high of 558 million in 1995, but fell to 444 million the next year when fares rose from ¥0.50 to ¥2.00. After fares rose again to ¥3.00 in 2000, annual ridership fell to 434 million from 481 million in 1999.

2001–2008: planning for the Olympics
In the summer of 2001, the city won the bid to host the 2008 Summer Olympics and accelerated plans to expand the subway. From 2002 to 2008, the city planned to invest ¥63.8 billion (US$7.69 billion) in subway projects and build an ambitious "three ring, four horizontal, five vertical and seven radial" subway network. Work on Line 5 had already begun on September 25, 2000. Land clearing for Lines 4 and 10 began in November 2003 and construction commenced by the end of the year. Most new subway construction projects were funded by loans from the Big Four state banks. Line 4 was funded by the Beijing MTR Corporation, a joint-venture with the Hong Kong MTR.

The next additions to the subway were surface commuter lines that linked to the north and east of the city. Line 13, a half loop that links the northern suburbs, first opened on the western half from Huilongguan to Xizhimen on September 28, 2002 and the entire line became operational on January 28, 2003. Batong line, built as an extension to Line 1 to Tongzhou District, was opened as a separate line on December 27, 2003. Work on these two lines had begun respectively in December 1999 and 2000. Ridership hit 607 million in 2004.

Line 5 came into operation on October 7, 2007. On the same day, subway fares were reduced from between ¥3 and ¥7 per trip, depending on the line and number of transfers, to a single flat fare of ¥2 with unlimited transfers. The lower fare policy caused the Beijing Subway to run a deficit of ¥600 million in 2007, which was expected to widen to ¥1 billion in 2008. The Beijing municipal government covered these deficits to encourage mass transit use, and reduce traffic congestion and air pollution. On a total of 655 million rides delivered in 2007, the government's subsidy averaged ¥0.92 per ride.

In the summer of 2008, in anticipation of the Summer Olympic Games, three new lines—Line 10 (Phase 1), Line 8 (Phase 1) and the Capital Airport Express—opened on July 19. The use of paper tickets, hand checked by clerks for 38 years, was discontinued and replaced by electronic tickets that are scanned by automatic fare collection machines upon entry and exit of the subway. Stations are outfitted with touch screen vending machines that sell single-ride tickets and multiple-ride Yikatong fare cards. The subway operated throughout the night from Aug. 8-9, 2008 to accommodate the Opening Ceremonies of the Olympic Games, and is extending evening operations of all lines by one to three hours (to 1-2 a.m.) through the duration of the Games. The subway set a daily ridership record of 4.92 million on August 22, 2008, the day of the Games' closing ceremony. In 2008, total ridership rose by 75% to 1.2 billion.

2008–present: rapid expansion
After the Chinese government announced a ¥4 trillion economic stimulus package in November 2008, the Beijing urban planning commission further expedited subway building plans, especially for elevated lines to suburban districts that are cheaper to build. In December 2008, the commission moved completion dates of the Yizhuang and Daxing Lines to 2010 from 2012, finalized the route of the Fangshan Line, and unveiled the Changping and Xijiao Lines. 

Line 4 started operation on September 28, 2009, bringing subway service to much of western Beijing. It is managed by the MTR Corporation through a joint venture with the city. In 2009, the subway delivered 1.457 billion rides, 19.24% of mass transit trips in Beijing.

In 2010, Beijing's worsening traffic congestion prompted city planners to move the construction of several lines from the 13th Five Year Plan to the 12th Five Year Plan. This meant Lines 8 (Phase III), the Yanfang line, as well as additional lines to Changping District and Tiantongyuan were to begin construction before 2015. Previously, Lines 3, 12 and 16 were being planned for the more distant future. In the same year, the Beijing government unveiled an ambitious expansion plan envisioning the subway network to reach a track density of 0.51 km per km2 (0.82 mi per sq. mi.) inside the Fifth Ring Road where residents would on average have to walk  to the nearest subway station. Ridership reached 2.18 billion in 2011.

Retroactively implying that the original three ring, four horizontal, five vertical and seven radial plan was part of Phase I expansion. Line 17 was planned to run north–south, parallel and to the east of Line 5, from Future Science Park North to Yizhuang Zhanqianqu South. Line 19 was planned to run north–south, from Mudanyuan to Xin'gong.

The subway delivered 2.46 billion rides in 2012.

On May 5, 2013, the Line 10 loop was completed with the opening of the Xiju-Shoujingmao section and the Jiaomen East Station. The  loop line became the longest underground subway loop in the world. The subway's total length reached . On December 28, 2013, two sections were added to Line 8, which extended the line north to Zhuxinzhuang and south to Nanluoguxiang. In 2013, the subway delivered 3.209 billion rides, an increase of 30% from the year before.

At the same time, the ¥2 flat-rate fare was replaced with a variable-rate fare (a minimum of ¥3), to cover operation costs. In 2014, the subway delivered 3.387 billion rides, an increase of 5.68% from the year before. Average daily and weekday ridership also set new highs of 9.2786 million and 10.0876 million, respectively.

From 2007 to 2014, the cost of subway construction in Beijing rose sharply from ¥0.571 billion per km to ¥1.007 billion per km. The cost includes land acquisition, compensation to relocate residents and firms, actual construction costs and equipment purchase. In 2014, city budgeted ¥15.5 billion for subway construction, and the remainder of subway building costs was financed by the Beijing Infrastructure Investment Co. LTD, a city-owned investment firm.

In 2014, Beijing planning authorities assessed mass transit monorail lines for areas of the city in which subway construction or operation is difficult. Straddle beam monorail trains have lower transport capacity and operating speed than conventional subways, but are quieter to operate, have smaller turning radius and better climbing capability, and cost only one-third to one-half of subways to build. The line was to begin construction in 2014 and would take two years to complete.

In early 2015, plans for both monorail lines were shelved indefinitely, due to low capacity and resident opposition. The Yuquanlu Line remains on the city's future transportation plan, and it will be built as a conventional underground subway line. The Dongsihuan Line was replaced by the East extension of Line 7.

Ridership in 2015 fell by 4% to 3.25 billion due to a fare increase from a flat fare back to a distance based fare.

With the near completion of the three ring, four horizontal, five vertical and seven radial subway network, work began on Phase II expansion projects. These new extensions and lines will be operational in 2019~2021. The northern section of Line 16 opened on December 31, 2016. Ridership reached a new high of 3.66 billion. On December 30, 2017, a one-station extension of Fangshan Line (Suzhuang – Yancun East), Yanfang line (Yancun Dong - Yanshan), Xijiao line (Bagou - Fragrant Hills) and S1 line (Shichang – Jin'anqiao) were opened. On December 30, 2018, the western extension of Line 6 (Jin'anqiao – Haidian Wuluju), the South section of Line 8 (Zhushikou – Yinghai), a one-station extension on Line 8 North section (Nanluoguxiang – National Art Museum), a one-station extension on Yizhuang line (Ciqu – Yizhuang Railway Station) were opened. On September 26, 2019, the Daxing Airport Express (Phase 1) (Caoqiao - Daxing Airport)was opened. On December 28, 2019, the eastern extension of Line 7 (Jiaohuachang-Huazhuang) and the southern extension of Batong line (Tuqiao-Huazhuang) were opened.

On January 24, 2020, the day after the lock down was declared in the city of Wuhan to contain the outbreak of COVID-19 in China, the Beijing Subway began testing body temperature of passengers at the 55 subway stations including the three main railway stations and capital Airport. Temperature checks expanded to all subway stations by January 27.

On April 4, 2020, at 10:00am, Beijing Subway trains joined in China's national mourning of lives lost in the COVID-19 pandemic, by stopping for three minutes and sounding their horns three times, as conductors and passengers stood in silence. To control the spread of COVID-19, certain Line 6 trains were outfitted with smart surveillance cameras that can detect passengers not wearing masks.

In May 2020, the Beijing Subway began to pilot a new style of wayfinding on Line 13 and Airport Express. However, since then the new designs were not rolled out to other lines or even new lines that opened afterward.

On December 31, 2020, the middle section of Line 16 (Xi Yuan-Ganjia Kou), the northern section of the Fangshan line (Guogongzhuang-Dongguantou Nan(S)), and the Yizhuang T1 line tram were opened.

On August 26, 2021, Line 7 and Batong line extended to  station. On August 29, 2021, through operation of Line 1 and Batong line started. On December 31, 2021, the initial sections of Line 11（Jin'anqiao - Shougang Park), Line 17 (Shilihe - Jiahuihu), Line 19(Mudanyuan - Xingong); extensions of Capital Airport Express(Dongzhimen - Beixinqiao), Changping line(Xierqi - Qinghe Railway Station), Line S1(Jin'anqiao - Pingguoyuan), Line 16（Ganjiakou - Yuyantan Park East Gate); and the central sections of Line 8(Zhushikou - National Art Museum) and Line 14(Beijing South Railway Station - Xiju) were opened. With the completion of the central sections of Line 8 and 14 along with the final section of Line S1 marks the completion of the three ring, four horizontal, five vertical and seven radial subway network plan (retroactively named Phase I expansion).

On July 30, 2022, stations Beitaipngzhuang, Ping'anli, Taipingqiao, Jingfengmen of Line 19 were opened.On December 31, 2022, the extension of Line 16 (Yuyantan Park East Gate - Yushuzhuang) was opened.

On January 18,2023,  in the morning and evening peak hours of the workday, the cross-line operation of Fangshan Line and Line 9 began. On February 4, 2023, the extension of Changping Line (Qinghe Railway Station - Xitucheng) was opened.

Ridership

Facilities

Accessibility

Each station is equipped with ramps, lifts, or elevators to facilitate wheelchair access. Newer model train cars now provide space to accommodate wheelchairs. Automated audio announcements for incoming trains are available in all lines. On all lines, station names are announced in Mandarin Chinese and English. Under subway regulations, riders with mobility limitations may obtain assistance from subway staff to enter and exit stations and trains, and visually impaired riders may bring assistance devices and guide dogs into the subway.

Cellular network coverage
Mobile phones can currently be used throughout the network. In 2014, Beijing Subway started upgrading cellular networks in the Beijing subway to 4G. In 2016, the entire subway network has 4G coverage. Since 2019, 5G coverage is being rolled out across the network.

Commercial facilities 
In the 1990s a number of fast food and convenience stores operated in the Beijing Subway. In 2002, fourteen Wumart convenience stores opened in various Line 2 stations.

After witnessing the Daegu subway fire in February 2003, the Beijing Subway gradually removed the 80 newsstands and fast food restaurants across 39 stations in Line 1 and Line 2. The popular underground mall at Xidan station was closed. This is in contrast other systems in China which added more station commerce as they started to rapidly expand their networks. Since the implementation of this policy new lines did not have any station commerce upon opening.

Passengers consistently complained that the lack of station commerce in the Beijing Subway is inconvenient. In the early 2010s, Beijing Subway started reversing some of these policies. Vending machines selling drinks and snacks has gradually introduced inside stations since 2013. Later machines with of common items such as flowers, earphones, masks, etc. were also introduced. In 2013, China Resources Vanguard and FamilyMart expressed interest in opening convenience stores in the Beijing Subway but this never materialized.

The survey report on passenger satisfaction in subway services since 2018 shows that more than 70% of passengers want convenience stores in subway stations, especially for various hot and cold drinks, ready-to-eat food, and bento meals. In December 2020, "the deployment of 130 convenient service facilities at subway stations" was listed as a key project for the Beijing municipal government. On 25 July 2021, Beijing Subway selected three stations, Hepingli Beijie station of Line 5, Qingnian Lu station of Line 6, and Caishikou station of Line 7, to carry out a pilot program of opening convenience stores. Since December 2021, a rapid rollout of station commerce began on a large scale across the network with a variety of commercial establishments such as bookstores, pharmacies, flower shops and specialty vendors being constructed inside stations.

Information hotline and app
The Beijing Subway telephone hotline was initiated on the eve of the 2008 Summer Olympic Games to provide traveler information, receive complaints and suggestions, and file lost and found reports. The hotline combined the nine public service telephones of various subway departments. On December 29, 2013, the hotline number was switched from (010)-6834-5678 to (010)-96165 for abbreviated dialing. In December 2014, the hotline began offering fare information, as the subway switched to distance-based fare. The hotline has staffed service from 5 am to midnight and has automated service during unstaffed hours.

The Beijing Subway has an official mobile application and a number of third-party apps.

English station names 
According to the related rules released in 2006, all the place names, common names and proper names of subway stations and bus stops should use uppercase Hanyu Pinyin. For example, Nanlishi Lu Station should be written as NANLISHILU Station. However, names of venues can use English translation, such as Military Museum.

According to the translation standard released in December 2017, station names of rail transit and public transport have to follow the laws.

Since December 2018, Beijing Subway changes the format of names of the new subway stations every year. On the subway map of December 2018, the station names used Roman script, and it gave consideration to English writing habit and pronunciation. The format changed to verbatim in December 2019, where the positions (East, South, West and North) were written in Hanyu Pinyin and an English abbreviation was added to them.

Since 31 December 2021, Beijing Subway has started using new station name format. The Pinyin "Zhan" is used instead of English word "Station" on the light box at the subway entrance. This caused a strong disagreement. Citizens criticized it "Chinese do not need to read and foreigners cannot read it". Some of the landmark named stations uses Chinese name, Hanyu Pinyin and English translation. Station names end with positions no longer add English abbreviation. Some of the stations that used English translation names (such as Shahe Univ. Park, Life Science Park and Liangxiang Univ. Town) changed to Hanyu Pinyin only (The new station names are Shahe Gaojiaoyuan, Shengming Kexueyuan and Liangxiang Daxuecheng).

System upgrades

Capacity

With new lines drawing more riders to the network, the subway has experienced severe overcrowding, especially during the rush hour. Since 2015, significant sections of Lines 1, 4 – Daxing, 5, 10, 13, Batong and Changping are officially over capacity during rush hour. By 2019, Lines 1, 2, 4, 5, 6 and 10 all have daily weekday ridership's of over 1 million passengers a day each. In short term response, the subway upgraded electrical, signal and yard equipment to increase the frequency of trains to add additional capacity. Peak headways has been reduced to 1 min. 43 sec. on Line 4; 1 min. 45 sec. on Lines 1, 5, 9, and 10; 2 min. on Lines 2, 6 and 13; 2 min. and 35 sec. on Line 15; 3 min. on Batong; 3 min. 30 sec. on Line 8; and 15 min. on the Airport Express. The Beijing Subway is investigating the feasibility of reducing headways of Line 10 down to 1 min 40 seconds.

Lines 13 and Batong have converted 4-car to 6-car trains. Lines 6 and 7 have longer platforms that can accommodate 8-car type B trains, while lines 14, 16, 17 and 19 use higher capacity wide-body type A trains (all mentioned except Line 14 use eight-car trains). New lines that cross the city center such as Line 3 and Line 12, now under construction, will also adopt high capacity 8-car type A trains with a 70 percent increase in capacity over older lines using 6 car type B. When completed these lines are expected to greatly relieve overcrowding in the existing network. 

Despite these efforts, during the morning rush hour, conductors at line terminals and other busy stations must routinely restrict the number of passengers who can board each train to prevent the train from becoming too crowded for passengers waiting at other stations down the line. Some of these stations have built queuing lines outside the stations to manage the flow of waiting passengers. As of August 31, 2011, 25 stations mainly on Lines 1, 5, 13, and Batong have imposed such restrictions. By January 7, 2013, 41 stations on Lines 1, 2, 5, 13, Batong, and Changping had instituted passenger flow restrictions during the morning rush hour. The number of stations with passenger flow restrictions reached 110 in January 2019, affecting all lines except Lines 15, 16, Fangshan, Yanfang and S1. Lines 4, 5, 10 and 13 strategically run several empty train runs during rush hour bound for specific stations help clear busy station queues. Counter peak flow express trains started operating on Line 15, Changping and Batong to minimize line runtimes and allow the existing fleet size to serve more passengers during peak periods. Additionally, investigations are being carried out on Line 15 and Yizhuang for upgrading to 120 km/h operations.

Transfers

Interchange stations that permit transfers across two or more subway lines receive heavy traffic passenger flow. The older interchange stations are known for lengthy transfer corridors and slow transfers during peak hours. In 2011, this station was rebuilt to reduce the transfer distance. There are plans to rebuild other interchange stations such as Dongzhimen.

Many of the newer interchange stations including Guogongzhuang (Lines 9 and Fangshan), Nanluoguxiang (Lines 8 and 6), Zhuxinzhuang (Changping and Line 8), Beijing West railway station (Lines 9 and 7), National Library (Lines 9 and 4), Yancun East (Fangshan Line and Yanfang Line) feature cross platform transfers. Nevertheless, longer transfer corridors must still be used when the alignment of the lines do not permit cross-platform transfer.

Safety

Security check

To ensure public safety during the 2008 Summer Olympic and Paralympic Games, the subway initiated a three-month heightened security program from June 29 to September 20, 2008. Riders were subject to searches of their persons and belongings at all stations by security inspectors using metal detectors, X-Ray machines and sniffer dogs. Items banned from public transportation such as "guns, ammunition, knives, explosives, flammable and radioactive materials, and toxic chemicals" were subject to confiscation. The security program was reinstituted during the 2009 New Year Holiday and has since been made permanent through regulations enacted in February 2009.

Accidents and incidents
The subway was plagued by numerous accidents in its early years, including a fire in 1969 that killed six people and injured over 200. But its operations have improved dramatically and there have been few reported accidents in recent years. Most of the reported fatalities on the subway are the result of suicides. Authorities have responded by installing doors on platforms of newer lines.

On October 8, 2003, the collapse of steel beams at the construction site of Line 5's Chongwenmen station killed three workers and injured one. On March 29, 2007, the construction site at the Suzhoujie station on Line 10 collapsed, burying six workers. On June 6, 2008, prior to the opening of Line 10, a worker was crushed to death inside an escalator in Zhichunlu station when an intern turned on the moving staircase. On July 14, 2010, two workers were killed and eight were injured at the construction site of Line 15's Shunyi station when the steel support structure collapsed on them. On September 17, 2010, Line 9 tunnels under construction beneath Yuyuantan Lake were flooded, killing one worker. A city official who oversaw waterworks contracts at the site was convicted of corruption and given a death sentence with reprieve. On June 1, 2011, one worker was killed when a section of Line 6 under construction in Xicheng District near Ping'anli collapsed. A collapse of an escalator at the Beijing Zoo Station on July 5, 2011, caused the death of one 13-year-old boy and injuries to 28 others.

On July 19, 2012, a man was fatally shot at Hujialou station by a sniper from the Beijing Special Weapons and Tactics Unit after taking a subway worker hostage.

On May 4, 2013, a train derailed when it overran a section of track on Line 4. The section was not open to the public and was undergoing testing. There were no injuries.

On November 6, 2014, a woman was killed when she tried to board the train at Huixinxijie Nankou station on Beijing Subway's Line 5. She became trapped between the train door and the platform edge door and was crushed to death by the departing train. The accident happened on the second day of APEC China 2014 meetings in the city during which the municipal government has banned cars from the roads on alternate days to ease congestion and reduce pollution during the summit – measures which the capital's transport authorities have estimated would lead to an extra one million passengers on the subway every day.

No passengers were on board and the driver faced leg injuries.

On January 1, 2018, a Xijiao line train derailed around Fragrant Hills station. There were no injuries. Fragrant Hills station was temporarily closed until 1 March 2018.

Subway culture

Logo

The subway's logo, a capital letter "G" encircling a capital letter "D" with the letter "B" silhouetted inside the letter D, was designed by Zhang Lide, a subway employee, and officially designated in April 1984. The letters B, G, and D form the pinyin abbreviation for 
"".

Subway Culture Park

The Beijing Subway Culture Park, located near  in Daxing District, opened in 2010 to commemorate the 40-year history of the Beijing Subway. The  park was built using dirt and debris removed from the construction of the Daxing line and contains old rolling stock, sculpture, and informational displays. Admission to the park is free.

Beijing Suburban Railway

The Beijing Suburban Railway, a suburban commuter train service, is managed separately from the Beijing Subway. The two systems, although complementary, are not related to each other operationally. Beijing Suburban Railway is operated by the China Railway Beijing Group.

There are 4 suburban railway lines currently in operation: Line S2, Sub-Central line, Huairou–Miyun line and Tongmi line.

Network Map

See also
 List of Beijing Subway stations
 Transport in Beijing
 List of metro systems

Notes

References

External links 

 Official Beijing Subway website. Detailed information only for the lines operated by Beijing Subway.
 Official Beijing MTR Website  (Chinese). For the 5 lines operated by MTR Beijing.
 Official Beijing MTR Website  (English)
 Official Beijing Metro Operation Administration (BJMOA) Website For Line 19, Yanfang line, Daxing Airport Express operated by Beijing Metro Operation Administration (BJMOA).
 Beijing Subway Information on UrbanRail.net

 
Underground rapid transit in China
Busking venues
1969 establishments in China
Standard gauge railways in China